is a fictional character in SNK's The King of Fighters series of fighting games. The character was first introduced in the 1994 video game The King of Fighters '94 as the leader of the Japanese team from the series' title tournament. Kyo, heir to the Kusanagi clan, is first introduced as a cocky, delinquent high-school student who has pyrokinetic powers. His clan is one of three who banished the legendary snake demon entity Yamata no Orochi. During the series' story, Kyo meets rivals and enemies who seek to take his flame abilities. Aside from the main series, Kyo appears in several crossovers and spinoffs with other games. He is also the central title character of the manga The King of Fighters: Kyo and video game adaptation with the same name which center around his daily life.

Kyo was created by Shinichi Morioka as a hero who would fight the main characters from other SNK franchises, such as Fatal Fury and Art of Fighting. His debut in The King of Fighters received a large positive response by fans, making Kyo return in The King of Fighters '99 where he was originally non available in early versions. His outfit and gameplay techniques were redesigned throughout the series; since his original appearance, featuring a high-school uniform, became popular with fans, designers created clones of his original costume in later games. The same occurred with his moves, which have been re-balanced across the series.

Video game journalists have praised Kyo's design and fighting style as among the best of the series, and in fighting games in general. His role in the story and his long rivalry with Iori Yagami were also celebrated. The character's redesign in The King of Fighters XIV earned mixed responses because of the differences from previous incarnations. Kyo's role in printed media and other adaptations of the series has often been criticized, most notably in the live-action film. A variety of Kyo collectibles, including key chains and figurines, has been created.

Conception and creation

Origin and influences

Kyo Kusanagi was created by artist Shinichi Morioka. When designing characters for the first King of Fighters game, developers wanted a new, "snazzy" hero who would fight against characters from two other SNK series, Fatal Fury and Art of Fighting. Through most of his development, Kyo was named  and was dressed in martial arts clothing common in fighting games of the time. His design was inspired by the main character of Katsuhiro Otomo's manga and film Akira, Shotaro Kaneda. Late in production, his name was changed to Kyo Kusanagi, as a means of relating the character to the Yamata no Orochi legend, which was the basis of the story arc of the game. The name Syo would later be used for Kyo's Another Striker in The King of Fighters 2000. Another planned name before Syo was  but no design was elaborated from it. However, in the end SNK chose the name Kyo as they felt it more fitting.

While in charge of designing the character, Yuichiro Hiraki sought to contrast Kyo with Street Fighter character Ryu, as he believed the latter was a popular character in international markets and that Kyo's characterization and design could benefit from appealing to as broad a demographic as possible. Despite Kyo originally being depicted as a lazy young adult, he shows a notable character arc across the games: he develops a new fighting style on his own which contrasts his original concept of being born with talent. In contrast to Terry and Ryo, Kyo was given a natural life in his debut. However, the death of his father Saisyu at the hands of Rugal Bernstein was executed to make him more tragic and serious when it came to his training, leaving Japan in his ending to become stronger in future battles.

When making The King of Fighters '94, developers thought Kyo would appeal to audiences by contrasting starkly with characters from Fatal Fury, whose characters were much older and had more muscular bodies than Kyo's. Kyo's girlfriend Yuki was also created by Morioka. By the next game, SNK introduced Iori Yagami as Kyo's rival; in contrast to Kyo, SNK decided to keep Iori's life as private as possible in order to differentiate the two characters. The rivalry between these two men was noted to stand out across the franchise with Ogura claiming despite having the two characters having differences, they still have respect towards each other, making their team ups with Chizuru Kagura to defeat a common enemy feel natural. According to the scenario writer, while Kyo and Benimaru's relationship was initially that of rivals to, it eventually became a case of siblings with Benimaru acting like the older ones. Ureshino also finds that the romance between Kyo and Yuki ended up being nicely written to the point they feel like a married couple in The King of Fighters XV.

The game's developers decided Kyo's main abilities would be fire-based, alongside the movesets of the other characters in the original Japan Team, who were all inspired by the manga and anime Getter Robo, created by Go Nagai and Ken Ishikawa. The three members of the Japan Team, Benimaru Nikaido, Goro Daimon and Kyo, had personalities similar to those of the main characters from Getter Robo. Kyo was based on the main character, Ryoma Nagare, who had a fiery persona. The elements and the personalities were also a homage to a Japanese phrase about giving birth to fire: "lightning strikes the earth which sparks the flame". According to Morioka, Ikki Kajiwara's Ashita no Joe and Nagai's Devilman manga series were influences too. Artist Nona said he found it difficult to design Kyo as a heroic character due to his dark traits, noting the character was also inspired by Akira Fudo, the protagonist of Devilman. Kyo's pixel art was created by Hiraki, who despite leaving SNK to work on another project a few years later, was asked by Capcom's Kaname Fujioka to once again work on Kyo's design for the crossover game Capcom vs. SNK: Millennium Fight 2000. Artist Falcoon states that Kyo has a strong attitude, making him one of the hardest characters to illustrate, while also noting that his rivalry with Iori Yagami is strong enough to make the duo likable.

Designs and actors

In his first appearences, Kyo wears a modified version of his school uniform with a Sun mark that represents his heritage of the Kusanagi. During the early stages of development for The King of Fighters '99, SNK planned to exclude Kyo and Iori from the game because its story was centered on new protagonist K', but they reversed this decision because "they couldn't leave these popular characters in limbo". Kyo's repeated appearances in every game in the series, at the insistence of SNK executives for marketing purposes, made story planning for each title challenging, with artist Hiroaki Hashimoto expressing a desire for his work to live up to Shinkiro's, which he said left a great impression on him. Several of the series' designers said Kyo is one of the most difficult characters to illustrate because of his popularity. Although Kyo was redesigned for KOF '99, some designers wanted to return to his iconic school uniform. Near the end of production, staff could not decide which uniform the Kyo clone should wear, so the project head decided to make two clones. To save time, the project head drew designs for Kyo-1 and Kyo-2 on the character roster. The same situation occurred during production of The King of Fighters 2002; the designers created another clone of Kyo called "Kusanagi" to include his school uniform design.

The developers of the series for The King of Fighters 2001, Eolith, noted that Kyo and Iori were also popular in their country, which led to their immediate inclusion in their game. Falcoon redesigned Kyo's clothes for the spin-off game KOF: Maximum Impact 2; his jacket was redesigned while keeping the appeal of the original costume. His "Normal Color F" attire is similar to his father's martial arts clothing. The outfit called "Color G" is reminiscent of the costume design of Yuki, the popular protagonist of NeoGeo Battle Coliseum.

While Kyo often wears different outfits for each game's story mode, he was given a more masculine appearance for The King of Fighters XIII. Artist Ogura expressed pressure when designing this incarnation of the character, saying it had to live up to an enduring reputation. With designers believing he had become a more traditional fighter, they gave him a simpler, more modern appearance for The King of Fighters XIV. Character designer Nobuyuki Kuroki said staff wanted to captivate new fans with Kyo's larger design regardless of negative backlash. Producer Yasuyuki Oda noted that while researching new characters for KOF XIV, Kyo's moves avoided stereotypes like Japanese sumo wrestlers to produce more variety within the cast, which included characters of multiple nationalities. Oda added that they "Kyo-ify" the new members to produce originality in the game. His appearance in KOF XV was altered to look like his previous looks while altering other parts of his design like his jacket and gloves.

Yuichi Nakamura portrayed Kyo in a commercial promoting the cellphone game The King of Fighters All Stars, alongside Hiroshi Fujioka. In the live-action film, Kyo was portrayed by Sean Faris. Kyo's Japanese voice actor Masahiro Nonaka related with his character as being young and reckless until he "grew up" in his later appearances. He then expressed some difficulty accepting Kyo on the same level. Tomoaki Maeno replaced Nonaka for The King of Fighters XIV and said he was putting all his efforts and expected the fandom to enjoy his work as the new voice of Kyo. Maeno noted the impact of Kyo was challenging as he was the main character from a famous series of fighting games. He often played the demo of The King of Fighters XIV as Kyo in order to fully appreciate the character. For The King of Fighters for Girls, Maeno was careful with his performance as he understands due to how beloved is his character. He was careful in his songs and took a liking to the catchphrase "Moetaro?" (Got burned?).

Fighting style
This was developed by Mitsuo Kodama, an animator in charge of the first game in the series. In later series' tournaments, he combines fire with a personal style of kenpō. His fighting style was changed as part of the series' overhaul in The King of Fighters '96. To appease fans, producers also included an older version of Kyo from KOF '94 into The King of Fighters '97 and placed The King of Fighters '95 version of Kyo in The King of Fighters '98, which increased the character's popularity during location tests. Oda also noted that Kyo was one of his favorite characters in the series as found his moves easy to learn. Kyo's gameplay was modified again for The King of Fighters '99 onwards, with most of his original moves being left for his clones.

Although Kyo retains his third outfit in The King of Fighters XII, his moves were modified to those from the first two games of the series to make the character fight in close quarters rather than using projectiles, improving the balance of the roster, and making fights more entertaining. The staff worked to incorporate this move into the game carefully, trying to make it as realistic as possible while using enhanced special effects. Based on Japanese myths, the Orochinagi was conceptualized as the move Kyo would use to defeat the demon known as Yamato no Orochi. This was given a mid-air variation for The King of Fighters XIII; designers kept in mind the concept of coolness and the small difficulty in performing it. Kyo's Neo Max technique, the "", in which he covers the enemies with walls of fire, was the first move of this category to be made for the game. As a result, the other characters' Neo Max techniques were reformatted so as to be comparable with Kyo's move.

"NESTS Kyo" was added to the game as downloadable content; this version focused on his hand-to-hand combat, contrasting from his original moves in XIII. SNK worked to balance this version of the character to the original, ensuring neither version would be superior to the other. His Neo Max is a new technique named  which covers the entire screen in flames. For The King of Fighters XIV, Oda wanted to keep his gameplay intact in order to avoid fan backlash. Kyo's strongest move  is both a reference to his father's technique as well as the Kusanagi myths from his origins.

Appearances

In video games

In The King of Fighters main series
Kyo is one of the last members of the Kusanagi clan who can create fire; 660 years before the games' events, the Kusanagi and Yasakani clans were allies but the latter's jealousy over the former's fame led the Yasakani to make a pact with the snake demon Orochi. Since then, the clans have had a generation-long grudge with casualties on both sides. Kyo's rivalry with Iori Yagami is one of mutual hatred rather than history. In the first The King of Fighters video game, Kyo stars in the famous fighting tournament as the leader of the Japan Team with Benimaru Nikaido and Goro Daimon. They become champions and defeat the host Rugal Bernstein who has killed Kyo's father, Sasiyu. Kyo goes on a training quest in the aftermath. In the next title, the Japan Team again faces Rugal who has revived and brainwashed Saisyu in revenge. Following their fight, Saisyu is saved from Rugal's control and Kyo's defeat their nemesis again with the team leader confused by the energy he obtained.

Prior to the events of The King of Fighters '96, a man named Goenitz – a follower of Orochi – easily defeats Kyo, causing him to seek revenge. The tournament's host, Chizuru Kagura, wants Kyo and Iori Yagami on her team to help defeat Orochi and stop Goenitz, who is revealed to have granted Rugal new powers in the previous tournament. In The King of Fighters '97, Kyo faces Orochi's remaining followers, the New Faces Team, who aim to revive Orochi by sacrificing Kyo's girlfriend, Yuki. Following their failure, Orochi possess one of them, Chris, but Kyo and Iori manage to defeat him, leaving him to be sealed by Chizuru. In KOF '98, Kyo appears as a playable character on the Japan Team with Benimaru and Daimon. An alternative version of his character, with movesets used in previous games, is also playable.

Kyo is a secret character in most versions of The King of Fighters '99, and has no team. Kyo is kidnapped by the NESTS syndicate, who use his DNA to make clones of him. Kyo enters his captors' base and tries to obtain answers from them, but is forced to retreat when the base begins to collapse. If the player has accrued enough points, Kyo can be faced in a bonus fight. He continues his fight against the NESTS alone in The King of Fighters 2000 but in the next game, Kyo reunites with his old teammates, and his student Shingo Yabuki, to make a comeback on the Japan Team. In KOF 2002, Kyo is a playable character on the original Japan Team.

In The King of Fighters 2003, Chizuru appears to Kyo and Iori, asking them to form a team to investigate suspicious activities concerning the Orochi seal. During the investigation, the team is ambushed by the fighter Ash Crimson, who plans to get their clans' powers and steal them from Chizuru. In The King of Fighters XI, Kyo and Iori again form a team with Shingo, filling Chizuru's spot to stop Ash. The growing presence of Orochi, however, causes Iori to go berserk and harm his teammates. Ash then appears, defeats Iori, and steals his abilities. The PlayStation 2 port added an alternative version of Kyo that has his NESTS saga moves. In King of Fighters XII, Kyo is a playable character but he does not have a team. Kyo reunites with the original members of the Esaka Team in The King of Fighters XIII. Following Ash's disappearance causing Iori to recover his powers, Kyo fights his rival again. Additionally, an alternative version of himself, with different moves called "NESTS Style Kyo", is available as downloadable content.

Kyo returns in The King of Fighters XIV with his old comrades, where his classic school costume appears as downloadable content through pre-order bonus released in the online store. Kyo enters the tournament at the request of his father to meet Tung Fu Rue's students. After an unknown being stops the competition, Kyo reunites with Iori and Chizuru to reseal a weak Orochi, who had been previously revived. He is set to return in The King of Fighters XV.

The King of Fighters spin-offs
Kyo appears in a role-playing video game  titled The King of Fighters: Kyo, in which he travels around the world to prepare for The King of Fighters tournament until the events of KOF '97. In this game, Kyo's actor Masahiro Nonaka performs a song named "Pieces" during a karaoke fight between him and Iori. This song was included in the CD Drama NEO･GEO DJ Station. Kyo receives a letter for the KOF '97 tournament and has a month to travel across the world to form his team. Chizuru Kagura tests Kyo's will to fight by creating a scenario in which Kyo's girlfriend Yuki is kidnapped. Kyo appears in the spin-off video games The King of Fighters: Battle de Paradise as a member of a band. The King of Fighters R-1 again reprises the events of KOF '97; in this game Kyo also teams up with Shingo and Kim Kaphwan in an alternate scenario. In the sequel, The King of Fighters R-2, Kyo teams up with his father and Shingo. SNK also released a pachinko based on the series' Orochi storyline and focusing on Kyo's actions during the plot.

He is present in the spin-offs Neowave and the Maximum Impact series. In Maximum Impact 2, Kyo is playable as his classic version from the first games as well as with a new outfit. In each North American edition following Maximum Impact, Kyo is voiced by Andrew Roth, an English voice actor. During The King of Fighters EX: Neo Blood, Moe Habana, the heir of one of the ten sacred treasures, finds Kyo seriously wounded after his fight against Orochi. After healing him, Moe joins Kyo and Benimaru to participate in a tournament developed by the criminal Geese Howard, who is searching for the power of Orochi. In the sequel game The King of Fighters EX2: Howling Blood, Reiji Okami, another member of the ten sacred treasures, asks Kyo to join him as his teammate in a new tournament so they can investigate interference with the Orochi seal. He is present in the Chinese mobile phone games named KOF: WORLD, and KOF X Arena Masters. In the role-playing game The King of Fighters All Star Kyo is present in his original look as well as his NESTS persona. For the otome game King of Fighters for Girls, Maeno performed a duet song with Benimaru's actor titled "Let's Fight".

In other games
Kyo has also appeared in video games outside The King of Fighters series. He is a playable character in the shooter games Sky Stage, Neo Geo Heroes: Ultimate Shooting, NeoGeo Tennis Coliseum, and the rhythm-action mobile game The Rhythm Of Fighters. He is featured in the 2018 augmented reality game The King of Fighters Orochi Go and the Korean fighting game The King of Cyphers. In the crossover video games Neo Geo Battle Coliseum and SNK vs. Capcom series, Kyo appears as a playable character; in the former game he appears with his NESTS costume while in the latter he is wearing his school uniform. He is also a character card in SNK vs. Capcom: Card Fighter DS. Kyo additionally appears both as one of the background characters and as a spirit in the Nintendo crossover fighting game Super Smash Bros. Ultimate.

He is featured in the card-battle video games Lord of Vermillion Re:2's Tie-Ups and Core Masters, and fighting game Lost Saga. Despite not being playable in SNK Gals' Fighters and SNK Heroines: Tag Team Frenzy, he appears in the ending as a cross-dressed Iori and Shermie, respectively. He is present in the RPGs Kimi wa Hero in his regular outfit and in a vampire outfit in Brave Frontier, and in his school uniform in the Chinese mobile phone game Wangzhe Rongyao. He is available in the mobile games The King Fighters X Fatal Fury, Puzzle and Dragons, Boku & Dragon and Crusaders Quest. He is present in the dating sim part of the Days of Memories series, Metal Slug Defense, the beat-em up Fighting Days, A shooting game named Beast Busters has Kyo as a guest character, as does Lucent Heart. The character's NESTS arc look is also used in action role-playing Phantasy Star Online 2.

In other media
Aside from the main series, Kyo has appeared in other media from The King of Fighters series. In the anime The King of Fighters: Another Day, he is featured prominently in the fourth chapter as Ash Crimson stages a fight against Alba Miera, both of whom are stopped by Iori. A number of image songs and audio dramas featuring Kyo, including the contents of his own character-image album consisting of a number of his theme songs, have been released.

Kyo also appears in the manhua adaptation of The King of Fighters: Zillion, created by Andy Seto, which tells Kyo and Iori's story between their fight against Orochi until the one against NESTS. He stars in further manwhua for the games, starting with The King of Fighters 2001, ending with The King of Fighters 2003, and including the Maximum Impact series. Seto also wrote a prequel that shows how Kyo turned into a fighter, met his girlfriend Yuki, and befriended Benimaru and Daemon. Kyo also appears in a spin-off manga story entitled The King of Fighters: Kyo, which is based on the events following The King of Fighters '95; the story was  created by Masato Natsumoto and deals with Kyo's daily life. Ryo Takamisaki's manga The King of Fighters G shows an alternate retelling of KOF '96 where Kyo teams up with Athena Asamiya during the tournament. In the KOF XII manwua, Kyo briefly confronts Ash after recovering from Iori's berserker attack from XI and undergoing new training. Novelizations of the games also retell Kyo's in-game actions, although the KOF 2000 novelization has him returning to Yuki in a comic fashion in contrast to the original games in which he remains distant, apart from the NESTS syndicate. In the manga The King of Fighters: A New Beginning, Kyo once again battles his rival during his first round from the competition. The match ends as a tie but the Japan Team wins the battle due to Benimaru and Daimon defeating Iori's allies. The mercenaries from the Ikari Team later lead Kyo to fight an army of robots based on NESTS's Kyo clones. Enraged by the cartel, Kyo kills the recently reborn NESTS leader, Igniz, and destroys their base. Afterwards, Kyo reunites with his allies and the Yagami Team to face the wraith brought by a creature referred to as a Verse.

In The King of Fighters movie, Kyo is played by Sean Faris and is portrayed as Japanese-American. During the story, Kyo joins forces with Iori and Mai Shiranui to defeat Rugal.

In the CGI web series The King of Fighters: Destiny, Kyo goes to his first team tournament with Benimaru and Daimon. While he is first interested in fighting Terry Bogard, he becomes concerned when he senses the power of the Orochi within the fighters and seeks to stop the mastermind behind this. The web series has an extra episode that shows Kyo befriending Benimaru during a fight against multiple yakuza. After saving the tournament's fighters from Orochi's power, which causes them to go berserk, Kyo, Terry and Heidern meet Rugal, the person using them, and fight him. With help from his partners, Kyo defeats his enemy. He also appears in the trailer of the upcoming film The King of Fighters: Awaken challenging Goenitz.

Cultural impact

Critical response

Kyo Kusanagi received major praise ever since his introduction. In a retrospective review of the series' debut, VideoGamer.com called Kyo one of the most popular video game characters from Japan during his 1994 debut. Similarly, although the first King of Fighters game promoted the possibility of fights between Fatal Fury and Art of Fighting characters, Nintendo Life and Hobby Consolas regarded Kyo as the most popular character from the game, calling him the "best star" in the franchise. The sites also named him and Iori as among the best characters in the series. Damien McFerran of Virtual Console Reviews considered Kyo one of the best creations from The King of Fighters series, as well as the most original one. On the other hand, Den of Geek noted that while Kyo was introduced as a weak main character, as a result of the pressure of the series also using Terry Bogard and Ryo Sakazaki—heroes from other SNK's series—by the climax of the Orochi arc he becomes more appealing due to his role in this part and his new movesets. Critics also liked the rivalry between Kyo and Iori. The Daily Star noted that although Kyo and Iori begin as enemies, they become allies in later games, leading to their popularity. When joining with Chizuru Kagura and most notably Iori, the formation of the new Sacred Treasure Team in KOF '96 and KOF '97 for serving as a proper conclusion to the Orochi story arc during these two games.

Following the Orochi arc, in The King of Fighters '99, Kyo was originally a hidden character. He became instantly playable in the console ports, which led to praise within fans and writers. Kyo received mixed reactions when The King of Fighters XIV was first revealed as critics were divided on whether or not the design was faithful to the original. When the game was patched to improve the graphics, Siliconera said Kyo's appearance was highly improved. Anime News Network expressed disappointment that Kyo was not picked as a SNK representative character in Super Smash Bros. Ultimate, as he had few guest appearances in comparison to Terry Bogard.

Some critics commented on the character's moves. IGN writer A.E. Sparrow wrote that Kyo is one of the most enjoyable characters to play in the King of Fighters series, praising the dynamism of his moveset and fighting style. In another review, Sparrow considered him to be one of the most useful characters in the games and one of the best for veteran players. Gaming Age writer Jeff Keely praised Kyo's redesign in The King of Fighters '99, saying he felt less overpowered than in previous games, which helped to balance the cast, but still felt him weaker in comparison to the new character Terry Bogard. Electronic Gaming Monthly shared similar comments, stating he became a fan of Kyo thanks to his NESTS moves, which made his downloadable version from KOF XIII exciting, and Shoryuken said this version was more interesting than the regular Kyo. Prima Games listed his "Orochinagi" as the 40th best technique in gaming due to the way it covers the screen. Complex ranked Kyo as the 11th Most Dominant Fighting Game Character, praising his special moves. A Gamasutra writer enjoyed Kyo's mechanics in the Capcom vs. SNK series due to his uniqueness while being confronted by other characters. Meristation was bothered by Kyo's simple moves in The King of Fighters XII and XIII, and was pleased with the return of hand-to-hand techniques in XIV. The character's moves in XIV were noted to appeal to both newcomers and veterans of the franchise.

Outside the video games, Kyo has made appearances that met with disapproval by critics. Lucas M. Thomas from IGN lamented that Kyo has few appearances in the volume from the manhua The King of Fighters 2003 in comparison to Ash Crimson, who is the greater focus of the series. Den of Geek found the comic SVC Chaos ridiculous because Kyo's and other characters' death rea trivialized. John Funk from The Escapist found the trailer for the series' live-action film confusing because Kyo's race was changed from Japanese to white. Beyond Hollywood was also confused by Kyo's portrayal in the film because of flashbacks to his childhood depicting him as Japanese whereas his adult self is American. Stuff also had a harsh opinion of Kyo being played by Sean Faris despite the character's Asian origins. Kyo's portrayal in The King of Fighters: Destiny received more favorable responses because the plot does not solely focus on his history, but also other characters from the games. Anime UK News enjoyed Kyo's handling in the manga A New Beginning due to how his rivalry stands out in the first fight more than the new protagonist, Shun'ei.

Popularity
Kyo has been well-received by gamers; he has appeared in several popularity polls. In Gamest's 1997 Heroes Collection, Kyo was voted as the staff's second-favorite character behind Iori. In a 2005 poll by SNK-Playmore USA, he was voted the sixth fan-favorite character with 176 votes, which led to him having less inclusion on the cover of Maximum Impact in the North American release. Additionally, in the January 30, 1995, issue of Gamest magazine in Japan, Kyo was featured at No. 4 in the Top 50 Characters of 1994. In the character-popularity poll on the website of Neo Geo Freak magazine, he was voted the third-favorite character with 2,574 votes. In another poll from 1997, Kyo took first place with 2,160 votes. At a museum of videogames sponsored by the municipality of Rome, a special illustration listed Kyo as the mascot of the mid-1990s era of Neo Geo.

For the special endings in The King of Fighters '97, the video game journals Gamest, Famitsu and Neo Geo Freak created a team composed of three characters from the game so they would be featured in an image after passing the arcade mode. Neo Geo Freaks team was Kyo, Mai Shiranui and Billy Kane. In an ASCII Media Works poll, in which fans voted on video game or manga characters they would like to name their children after, Kyo's name was tenth in the male category. In the book Gaming Cultures and Place in Asia-Pacific, Kyo was named as one of the most popular video game characters in Hong Kong from the mid 1990s onwards, alongside Iori and Mai. In 2018, Kyo was voted the fifth-most-popular Neo Geo character. In 2008, Insert Credit, a publisher related to game piracy, created an 8-bit fighting game titled Top Fighter, in which Kyo was one of the characters.

Merchandising based on Kyo's appearance has also been released. Yutaka issued an articulated action figure and a puzzle of Kyo from KoF '97. With the release of new video games in the series, SNK developed new action figures and key-chains. To choose the covers for the Xbox 360 and PlayStation 3 ports of KOF XII, Ignition Entertainment started a survey on May 4, 2009, in which users of its forum could vote for one of two covers, one of which features Kyo and the other Iori.

SNK artist Falcoon said he believes Kyo appealed to gamers in the 1990s because of his appearance and fashion style. Two figurines based on Kyo's original form and his XIV look have been released, including a Nendoroid figure based on the former. The latter attracted Kuroki's attention. Kyo's image was used in late 2018 as part of collaborations between SNK and other companies.

References

Action film characters
Fictional Japanese people in video games
Fictional kenpō practitioners
Fictional martial artists in video games
Fictional male martial artists
Fictional mixed martial artists
Male characters in video games
SNK protagonists
The King of Fighters characters
Video game characters introduced in 1994
Video game characters with fire or heat abilities
Video game mascots